is a timpanist, percussionist, xylophonist and marimbist. He  became a naturalized American citizen and lives in San Diego, California.

Career
Tatsuo Sasaki received a Fulbright Scholarship to Juilliard while he was a senior at Tokyo University of Arts and Music and studied timpani with Saul Goodman, the timpanist with the New York Philharmonic. He received several lessons from noted xylophonist, Yoichi Hiraoka in New York and performed recitals in New York city. In 1966, Sasaki was accepted by The American Symphony directed by Leopold Stokowski as a percussionist. In 1967 he was invited by the Israel Philharmonic Orchestra and performed as the assistant timpanist and percussionist for two years. 

Sasaki returned to Japan in 1969 and became a member of the Japan Philharmonic. He served as a faculty at Sakuyo Conservatoire as percussion instructor and gave his first solo recital in Tokyo in 1972. 

Later that year, Sasaki was invited to the Orquestra Sinfonica Brazileiro and relocated to Rio de Janeiro as a principal timpanist.  After 18 months in the Orquestra, Peter Eros, music director of San Diego Symphony, invited Sasaki to his orchestra in the US.  Sasaki moved to San Diego in the fall of 1973 and served as principal timpanist for the San Diego Symphony and San Diego Opera until his retirement in 2006. He taught timpani, percussion and marimba at SDU (University of San Diego) and Grossmont College.

Sasaki was featured as a xylophone soloist with the San Diego Symphony, the Glendale Symphony and others. He performed Fantasy on Japanese Wood Prints composed by Alan Hovhaness   directed by Andre Kostelanetz; Marimba Concerto by Robert Kurka,; Concertino for marimba by Paul Creston, Suite No.2 by J.S.Bach, and other pieces. After retirement from the orchestra, Sasaki concentrated his work on the marimba through his teachings, masterclasses, and conducting marimba ensembles in Tokyo and Nagoya. In 2009 Sasaki formed "The Marimba Duo" with noted marimbist/music arranger/music publisher Michiko Noguchi in Tokyo. The Marimba Duo released several CDs and performed concerts.

Recorded CDs
    ”Xylophone Artistry” (Solo) Musical Heritage Society, US
    2009 ”Riverdance” (The Marimba Duo)   Kleos, US
    2011 ”Tempest” (The Marimba Duo)  Kleos, US
    2017 “Back to Bach” (The Marimba Duo + Marimba Ensemble)  Kojima Recording, Japan

References

News paper article
    O Globo/Projeto Aquarius 1972.12.18
    The San Diego Union/Classic Xylophonist Scores B-7 1975.2.4
    Evening Tribune,San Diego/the Sounds of Summer 1975.8.29
    The San Diego Union/Food and Homemking C-1 Classical Summer Picnic Dinner Has Symphony Music For Dessert 1976.8.12
    Los Angeles Times /Musical Reviews : Glendale Grab Bag at Pavilion 1977.1.17 Part 4-13 page

External links
Marimbist,Xylophonist,Conductor : Tatsuo Sasaki on YouTube
The Marimba Duo (Tatsuo Sasaki and Michiko Noguchi) on YouTube
YuYu interview Tatsuo and Shigeko Sasaki
Musicians of the San Diego Symphony,Tatsuo Sasaki (Principal Timpani)

Japanese percussionists
Marimbists
Xylophonists
Timpanists
Classical percussionists
1944 births
Living people
American percussionists
American classical musicians of Japanese descent
Musicians from Okayama Prefecture
Japanese emigrants to the United States